Xavi Milad Gnaulati (born January 22, 2005) is an American soccer player who plays as a midfielder for San Diego Loyal in the USL Championship.

Early career
Xavi Gnaulati was born and raised in San Diego County, California, playing youth soccer for San Diego Surf and winning the State Cup Championship with them in 2014.

Club career

San Diego Loyal
In April 2021, Gnaulati joined San Diego Loyal in the USL Championship and their inaugural USL Academy team, Loyal Select. He made his club debut in a training match against MLS side LA Galaxy in March 2021, and made his regular match debut for the club as a substitute in a friendly match against Liga MX side Club Tijuana on July 10, 2021.

Gnaulati made his professional debut for San Diego Loyal on April 6, 2022, at the age of 17 under manager Landon Donovan in the Loyal's inaugural U.S. Open Cup match against NISA side Albion San Diego, starting the match and playing 79 minutes before being substituted for Alejandro Guido in a 2–1 win.

International career

Youth
In January 2019, Gnaulati was called up for the United States under-14 camp in Carson, California. He was called up again for a United States youth team camp in May 2021.

Career statistics

References

External links 
 

2005 births
Living people
American soccer players
Association football midfielders
Soccer players from San Diego
Sportspeople of Iranian descent
American people of Iranian descent
American people of Italian descent
USL Championship players
San Diego Loyal SC players